

Wilhelm Schepmann (17 June 1894 – 26 July 1970) was an SA general in Nazi Germany and the last Stabschef (Chief of Staff) of the Nazi Stormtroopers.

Schepmann was an Obergruppenführer in the Nazi Party para-military branch known as the Sturmabteilung (SA) when he was appointed by Adolf Hitler to succeed Viktor Lutze as Stabschef (SA) in 1943. Lutze had died in May that year, after a serious car accident. However, by then the SA had been thoroughly marginalized as far as political power in Nazi Germany was concerned.
Since January 1939, the role of the SA was officially mandated as a training school for the German armed forces with the establishment of the SA Wehrmannschaften (SA Military Units). Then with the September 1939 invasion of Poland, the SA lost most of its remaining members to military service in the Wehrmacht (armed forces). The SA officially ceased to exist in May 1945 when Nazi Germany was defeated and surrendered. The SA was banned by the Allied Control Council shortly after Germany's capitulation. In 1946, the International Military Tribunal at Nuremberg formally judged the SA not to be a criminal organization.

Early life 
Wilhelm Schepmann was born June 1894 in the German city of Hattingen.
After attending the Gymnasium (secondary school), Wilhelm Schepmann completed the teacher’s seminar and then worked as a teacher in Hattingen. He served in the First World War from 1914 to 1918 as a soldier of the Westphalian Jägerbattalion No.7 and was deployed on both the western and eastern fronts. During the war, he was first company commander in the rank of lieutenant of the reserve, then battalion adjutant, and finally court officer. During the war he was wounded, receiving the Wound Badge (1918) in Black and Iron Cross 2nd class.

Political career 
Schepmann joined the Nazi Party (NSDAP) (No. 26.762) in 1925. Together with Viktor Lutze, he organized the formation of the SA in the Ruhr area and as early as 1928 he was a local Party leader. At the same time, he worked as an NSDAP city councillor and as an SA leader in Hattingen where he contributed significantly to making the city one of the strongholds of the Nazis in the Ruhr area. From 1932 to 1933 Schepmann was a member of the Prussian Landtag and from November 1933 a member of the Reichstag.

He worked as a leader of the SA subgroup Westphalia-South in the rank of SA superintendent. From November 1932 he took over the leadership of the SA Group Westfalen. In February 1933 he was appointed police president of Dortmund. On 1 April 1934 he became the leader of the SA Group X (Niederrhein and Westphalia). In the wake of the Night of the Long Knives, Schepmann took over the leadership of the SA Group in Saxony from November 1934 onwards.

In March 1936 Schepmann was commissioned to manage the position of the Kreishauptmann (district governor) of Dresden-Bautzen and received the appointment as district governor three months later. Subsequently, until August 1943, Schepmann served as the President of the Dresden-Bautzen district.

After the accidental death of Viktor Lutze on 2 May 1943, Max Jüttner took over the interim position of SA Chief of Staff. In August 1943 Schepmann became the Chief of Staff of the SA, although his promotion was not supported by all Party leaders. He held this position until the end of the war in Europe.

Sturmabteilung leader

Schepmann began working to restore the morale and the esteem of the SA. He managed to have units in the army (Panzerkorps Feldherrnhalle), Kriegsmarine, and Luftwaffe (Jagdgeschwader 6 Horst Wessel) given SA honour titles, and even a Waffen-SS division (18. SS Freiwilligen-Panzergrenadier-Division Horst Wessel). On 26 September 1944, Schepmann was appointed Chief of Staff for the German Volkssturm’s Shooting Training (Inspekteur der Schießausbildung im Deutschen Volkssturm).

Post-war 
After the end of the war in Europe, Schepmann lived under an assumed name ("Schumacher") in Gifhorn and worked as a material manager in the district hospital. In April 1949 he was recognized and arrested by the British Secret Intelligence Service, and tried before a Dortmund jury at the end of June 1950. He was sentenced to nine months’ imprisonment, appealed and was released in 1954. In the denazification process, he was classified as unloaded (category V) in April 1952.

Schepmann wanted to pursue his previous work as a teacher again, but this was refused by the Lower Saxony Ministry of Education. Nevertheless, in 1952, Schepmann was elected to the district council and to the municipal council via the BHE list in the county of Gifhorn. In 1956 he became honorary deputy mayor of Gifhorn. His re-election in 1961, however, resulted in a public outcry and Schepmann resigned from office.

Schepmann became involved in the All-German Bloc/League of Expellees and Deprived of Rights. In the early 1950s, he served as a member of the Landtag of Lower Saxony in West Germany. He is the father of Richard Schepmann, head of the Neo-Nazi publishing house Teut-Verlag, who was jailed in 1983 for inciting racial hatred.

Death 
Wilhelm Schepmman died on 26 July 1970 in Gifhorn.

Decorations and awards
1914 Iron Cross 2nd class
Kreuz für treue Dienste (Schaumburg-Lippe), 1917
1918 Wound Badge in Black, 1918
Nuremberg Party Day Badge, 1929
Honour Chevron for the Old Guard, February 1934
The Honour Cross of the World War 1914/1918 with Swords, 1934
Anschluss Medal, 1938
Sudetenland Medal, 1939
1939 Clasp to the Iron Cross 2nd Class, 1940
1939 Iron Cross 1st Class, 1940

References

Citations

Bibliography

External links
 

1894 births
1970 deaths
Sturmabteilung officers
Nazi Party officials
Recipients of the Iron Cross (1914), 2nd class
Members of the Reichstag of Nazi Germany
Recipients of the Iron Cross (1939), 1st class